Trupanea colligata is a species of tephritid or fruit flies in the genus Trupanea of the family Tephritidae.

Distribution
South Africa.

References

Tephritinae
Insects described in 1964
Diptera of Africa